The fourth session of the United Nations General Assembly opened on 20 September 1949 and ended 30 June 1950 at the Methodist Central Hall in London. The president was Carlos P. Romulo

References

External links
Yearbook of the United Nations, 1948-1949
Opening Of 4th General Assembly Of Uno 1949. Short video.
Report of third session: Annual report of the Secretary-General on the work of the organization, 1 July 1948 -30 June 1949. 7 July 1949, General Assembly official records: Fourth session – Supplement No. 1 (A/930)

4
1949 in the United Nations
1950 in the United Nations